Simon Palomares  is a German-born Australian comedian and actor of Spanish descent. He is best known for his character as cafe manager Ricardo "Ricky" Martinez in Acropolis Now.

Biography
Simon Palomares was born in Dusseldorf, Germany. His father almost emigrated with his young family to Canada, however while waiting at the Spanish emigration office, he bumped into a friend who advised him how cold the weather was in Canada and he then switched his decision and chose Australia as the place to emigrate to. Palomares studied drama and psychology at Deakin University (Rusden) and studied acting at the renowned Juan Carlos Corazza School in Madrid. Recently he completed a post-graduate degree in arts and entertainment management at Deakin University.

Stand-up comedy and theatre
Palomares was one of the creators and stars of the Wogs Out of Work comedy stage show, which later evolved into the Acropolis Now TV series. He has performed comedy shows in the United States, Canada, Spain and Argentina where he performs stand-up in Spanish. More recently, Palomares has toured Australia in a combination cooking program and stand-up comedy show called Palomares Cooks Calamares.

Palomares has worked as a writer in Madrid, Spain, for Lo Mas Plus, a nightly review program on Canal+, and directed a flamenco version of Lorca's The House of Bernarda Alba at the Malthouse Theatre in Melbourne. He performed 2007-2011 with fellow comedians George Kapiniaris, Joe Avati and Jason Chong in a national tour of their show Il Dago. In July 2011 Palomares was invited to the Just For Laughs Comedy Festival in Montreal by Paramount Comedy (Spain) to record a Spanish comedy TV special for Canadian OMNI Channel. In 2011 he also produced a 13 episode series for C31 in Melbourne called Passion to Profession.

Television and film
Most recently he has performed for the program Nuevos Comicos on Paramount Comedy (Spain) and completed a documentary called KO HO NAS (Cojones) for Special Broadcasting Service (SBS) shown in Australia on 11 November 2009. He wrote and directed a short film, The Usual, which was acclaimed at the St Kilda Film Festival.

In 2006, he created,  co-hosted and commentated on The Foosy Show, a program where contestants play table football (foosball), with George Kapiniaris on Channel 31 in Melbourne. In addition to his acting credits, he appeared as himself in an episode of the ABC series Smallest Room in the House, a series in which stand-up comedians told true stories of their upbringing.

Palomares has directed episodes of Neighbours and was second unit director on Totally Full Frontal. He has also provided voices in the video games Rome: Total War (2004) and Rome: Total War - Barbarian Invasion (2005).

He recently completed work on the series Romper Stomper Next Gen for Stan Television and the series Australian Gangster to be aired in 2021.

Latigo (Whip) An award winning documentary about Cuban comedians was produced and directed by Simon and will be featured in the 2021 Spanish Film Festival around Australia.

Filmography
 The Lighthorsemen (1987 film) as a Turkish officer
 Acropolis Now (1989 TV series) as Ricardo "Ricky" Martinez
 Mission: Impossible (US TV series) as a sailor in 1989 episode "The Greek"
 Shooting Elizabeth (1992 film) as Carlos
 Snowy (1993 TV series) as Manolo
 Time Trax (TV series) as Angelo in 1994 episode "The Gravity of It All"
 Snowy River: The McGregor Saga (TV series) as Prince Alfredo Perez in 1996 episode "Prince of Hearts"
 Blue Heelers (TV series) as Jeremy Phillips in 1998 episode "When Love Isn't Enough"
 Driven Crazy (TV series) as Pierre in 1998 episodes "The Cat with No Name" and "The Moonies"
 The Games (TV series) as Simon in 1998 episodes "Rural and Environment" and "Millennium Bug"
 La Spagnola (2001 film) as Ricardo
 Stingers (TV series) as Terry Joseph in 1998 episode "Innocents Abroad" and as Gino Londoni in 2001 episode "Closure"
 Signs of Life (2002 film)
 Stiff (2004 TV film) as Sam Rossi
 Il Dago
 Il Dago 2: Now With Noodles
 Big Mamma's Boy (2011) as Dr. Ricky Martinez
 Romper Stomper Next Gen (TV series) 2017
 Australian Gangster (TV series) 2021

References

External links
 www.simonpalomares.com
 
 Simon Palomares' MySpace page

Year of birth missing (living people)
Australian people of Spanish descent
German emigrants to Australia
Living people
Australian male television actors
Australian male comedians